The Hollow Doll is a 1990 book written by William Bohnaker and published by Ballantine Books.

The book is a sociological examination of Japan in terms of its culture and how it affects individual citizens. The book then goes into describing the "negative" aspects of Japanese society as a society that, unlike "The West" which functions on logic, Japanese society functions with a formulaic society.

And the book thus points out how it has many deficiencies and economic, civil, and social inequities underneath the polite, hardworking, and ceremonious veil of modern Japan.

References

 "In Short: nonfiction" By Susan Chira New York Times.
 "ISBN Lookup information"

1990 non-fiction books
Sociology books
Japanese culture
Ballantine Books books
Books about Japan